Louis Serge Clair (born April 1, 1940) was the Chief Commissioner of Rodrigues from February 4, 2003 until 4 August 2006, and former minister of Rodrigues. A charismatic and visionary leader, Serge Clair, in the 1960s, abandoned priesthood to pursue a career in politics. He went to Australia to further his studies. After his studies, he returned to Rodrigues to engage actively in politics.

Serge Clair founded his party, the Rodrigues People's Organisation (or OPR) in 1976. Quickly enough, he grew in popularity, and in 1982, his party won a seat in the general assembly of Mauritius for the first time. He won the elections in 1983, 1987, 1991, 1995 and 2000. In 2002, he resigned from the assembly to run in the Rodrigues regional election.

Rodrigues became autonomous in 2002 and established a regional assembly that participates in the general assembly of Mauritius.

References

1940 births
Living people
Chief Commissioners of Rodrigues
Members of the National Assembly (Mauritius)
People from Rodrigues
20th-century politicians
21st-century Mauritanian politicians
Rodrigues People's Organisation politicians